Cortinarius flexipes is a fungus, specifically a mushroom, a small brown species in the genus Cortinarius. It is commonly known as the Pelargonium webcap because of its unusual smell of Pelargonium (the household "geranium").

This species of mushroom is found in Europe and North America. It is hygrophanous, and  belongs to the Telamonia group, being thin-fleshed and having a dry cap and stipe.

Synonymy
Cortinarius paleaceus (Weinm.) Fr. and Cortinarius paleiferus Svrek  (sometimes written C. paleifer) have commonly been identified in Europe as separate species. C. paleiferus is defined as having more widely spaced gills, and has a pale violet mycelium at the base of the stipe.  Now these types are combined into one species and considered to be only varieties of C. flexipes.

Description
It is dark brown but becoming pale fawn on drying, with white hair-like scales especially near the edge. It is more or less pointed in the centre. Fruitbodies have the smell of Pelargonium (household geranium). The species is inedible.

See also
List of Cortinarius species

References

External links

flexipes
Fungi described in 1801
Fungi of Europe
Fungi of North America
Inedible fungi
Taxa named by Christiaan Hendrik Persoon